Stolzia is a genus of grasshoppers in the subfamily Incolacridinae (previously the monotypic tribe Incolacridini Tinkham, 1940; synonyms: Incolacri, Stolziini).  Species have been recorded from India and Malesia.

Description
The genus Stolzia differs from genera of Catantopinae by having an asymmetrical epiphallus (male) and in females, the dorsal valves of the ovipositor are apically broadened, rounded and distinctly serrate.

Species
The Orthoptera Species File lists:
 Stolzia aberrans (Willemse, 1938)
 Stolzia borneensis (Willemse, 1938)
 Stolzia fasciata (Willemse, 1933)
 Stolzia javana Ramme, 1941
 Stolzia nigromaculata (Willemse, 1938)
 Stolzia rubromaculata Willemse, 1930 - type species - locality Solok, Sumatra
Note: five species, previously placed here, have been moved to the restored genus Incolacris Willemse, 1932 and S. vietnamensis Storozhenko, 2020 is now placed in the new genus Asymmetritania Storozhenko, 2021.

References

External links

Acrididae genera
Orthoptera of Malesia